Crown Agent may refer to:
The Crown Agent, principal legal advisor to the Scottish Lord Advocate on prosecution matters
A member of a Crown Agency